Andami is a village in the Madukkur block, Pattukkottai Taluk of Thanjavur district, Tamil Nadu, India. It is located 48 KM towards South from District head quarters Thanjavur. 4 KM from Madukkur. 347 KM from State capital, Chennai, and is one of the 32 villages of Musugundan Community.

Demographics
Atr the 2001 census, Andami had a population of 1,337 with 624 males and 713 females. The sex ratio was 1143. The literacy rate was 70.5%.

References 

Villages in Thanjavur district